Mazlum (maẓlūm) is an Arabic term for "oppressed, ill-treated, injured, sinned-against" (the antonym being ẓālim "oppressor"; root ẓlm "to oppress").

In Shiism, the term adopted a meaning of "pietistic" tolerance, given as a byname to Husayn ibn Ali, who was killed in the Battle of Karbala. The term is used for a person who is unwilling to act against an injustice not out of cowardice but out of generosity or forbearance.

It came to be used as a male given name in the Perso-Arabic cultural sphere (and later also in   Turkish). 

People named Mazlum include:
 Mazlum Kortas, Turkish Cypriot stuntman
 Mazlum Çimen, Turkish musician
 Mazlum Doğan, Kurdish activist
 Mazlum Kayalar, Turkish politician
 a character in the medieval Arabic drama Delhemma

References

See also
Hasan-e Mazlum, village in Iran

Turkish masculine given names